According to the new highway numbering, Old National Highway 200 is now part of this highway.

National Highway 130 is a national highway of India. It connects Ambikapur-Katghora - Bilaspur-Raipur. National Highway Authority of India is upgrading this corridor for the ease of traffic.

Proposal of NHAI of upgradation

 Ambikapur - Katghora (2-Lane) 
 Katghora - Bilaspur (4-Lane)
 Bilaspur - Simga (4-Lane)
 Simga - Raipur (6-Lane)

Ambikapur=>Lakhanpur=>Maheshpur=>Udaypur=>Katghora(Korba dist.)

Junctions  

  near Simga.
  near Bilaspur 
  near Bilaspur
  near Katghora
  near Ambikapur

References 

 Adani-forays-into-road-infra-wins-rs-1140-cr-road-proj-in-chhattisgarh
 Dilip-Buildcon-bags-NHAI-project-worth-Rs-861-crore

National highways in India